was an encyclopedia originally compiled by the Catholic priest and theologian Louis Moréri (1643–1680). By later standards, it was highly specialized, for nearly all of its entries were on geographical and historical subjects, but it marked the start of a flood of other dictionaries and encyclopedias in Europe's vernaculars. In addition to being successful in its own right, Moréri’s  served as a springboard and foil for Pierre Bayle’s  (1697).

Moréri’s  appeared in numerous French editions between 1674 and 1759, growing in size with each edition. Moréri himself died after preparing materials for the second edition (1681). Thereafter, other Francophone scholars took charge of the compilation, notably Jean Le Clerc.

The Grand Dictionnaire was also translated and adapted into English, German, Dutch, and Spanish.

Online availability: Dictionnaire de Moréri and also here.

References

French encyclopedias
1674 books
17th-century encyclopedias